Google Dictionary is an online dictionary service of Google that can be accessed with the "define" operator and other similar phrases in Google Search. It is also available in Google Translate and as a Google Chrome extension. The dictionary content is licensed from Oxford University Press's OxfordDictionaries.com. It is available in different languages, such as English, Spanish and French. The service also contains pronunciation audio, Google Translate, a word origin chart, Ngram Viewer, and word games, among other features for the English-language version. Originally available as a standalone service, it was integrated into Google Search, with the separate service discontinued in August 2011.

Microsoft's Bing provides a similar dictionary service that also licenses dictionary data from Oxford Dictionaries. Apple also licenses dictionary data from Oxford for its iOS and macOS products.

History 
The service originated in Google Translate, and was launched as a standalone service (google.com/dictionary) in December 2009. Google displayed definitions from Collins COBUILD Advanced Learner's English Dictionary for English until August 2010, when it switched to the Oxford American College Dictionary.

After being integrated into Google Search, the dictionary was discontinued as a separate service on August 5, 2011, and can now be accessed with the "define" operator or by simply searching for a word. The dictionary service is also still available in Google Translate and can be accessed by selecting a single word. Google has also released the service as an extension for Chrome.

, Google licenses dictionary data from OxfordDictionaries.com for multiple languages, including British/American English, Spanish and French.

On Arabic Language Day (December 18) in 2015, Google added an Arabic-language dictionary, available globally, to the service that showed definitions, translations, and example usages of the word in a sentence.

In February 2017, online news website Daily Caller accused Google of changing the definition of the word "fascism" in Google Dictionary. It was later found that the definition was exactly from an external source and was not written by Google.

Google added a Hindi dictionary from Rajpal & Sons licensed via Oxford Dictionaries which also supported transliteration and translation to the service in April 2017.

In July 2017, the dictionary was made directly available by typing "dictionary" in Google Search and additional features such as a search box, autocomplete and search history were also added.

In January 2018, a "Similar-sounding words" feature was added to the English dictionary which highlights words that sound similar such as "aesthetic" and "ascetic", "pray" and "prey", "conscientious" and "conscious" etc. "Google Word Coach" vocabulary game was made available along with dictionary searches and as a separate game on mobile devices in February 2018. In August 2018, Google Search added an English and Hindi dictionary for mobile users in India with an option to switch to the English only dictionary.

A "learn to pronounce" option was added to the English dictionary in December 2018 which shows how a word is pronounced with its non-phonemic pronunciation respelling and audio in different accents (such as British and American)  along with an option to slow the audio down, visemes for pronunciations were also added in April 2019.

Languages
Google displays dictionaries for the following languages licensed from Oxford Dictionaries which provides data from its own and other published dictionaries.

See details for Oxford Dictionaries datasets licensing for other languages here.

See also
 Google
 List of Google products

Notes

References

External links
 
 Google Dictionary Extension for Google Chrome
 Google Dictionary Online — Provides a service via its JSON API
  - Discussion about Google Dictionary and its sources on Stackexchange

Dictionary
Internet properties disestablished in 2009
Online dictionaries